Chelsea railway station may refer to:

 Chelsea and Fulham railway station, a former station in London, United Kingdom, which closed in 1940
 Chelsea railway station, Melbourne, a station in Melbourne, Australia
 Two stations in Chelsea, Massachusetts, United States:
 Bellingham Square station, an existing station formerly as Chelsea
 Chelsea station (MBTA), a bus rapid transit and commuter rail station
 King's Road Chelsea railway station, a proposed station in London, United Kingdom
 Michigan Central Railroad Chelsea Depot, a former station in Chelsea, Michigan, United States, which closed in 1982